West Shaora Alim Madrasha is an alim madrasa, situated in West Shaora, Gaurnadi Upazila, Barisal District, Bangladesh. It became an alim madrasha in 1973. Its first principal was Mawlana Mohammad Abdul Jalil.

References

Madrasas in Bangladesh
Alia madrasas of Bangladesh